Kari Johansson (born 15 February 1947) is a Finnish ice hockey player. He competed in the men's tournament at the 1968 Winter Olympics.

References

1947 births
Living people
Finnish ice hockey forwards
Olympic ice hockey players of Finland
Ice hockey players at the 1968 Winter Olympics
Sportspeople from Turku